Ferenc Mayer (born 7 January 1908 at Nagyvarad, Romania, died November 9, 2000 at Hattenville, Normandy, France ), also known as François Mayer or Ferenc Mayer, was a Hungarian footballer who played as goalkeeper.

Career 
Mayer played in Ligue 1 with Cercle Athlétique de Paris from 1932 to 1934. He took penalties for the club. He then played two seasons at Stade Malherbe de Caen. Later, while at Racing Club de Strasbourg, he took part in the final of the 1936-1937 Coupe de France.

He also played for the Hungary national football team (amateur team).

Between 1944 and 1946, he was the coach of Stade Malherbe de Caen.

Notes and references

External links

Hungarian footballers
CA Paris-Charenton players
Stade Malherbe Caen players
RC Strasbourg Alsace players
Hungarian football managers
Stade Malherbe Caen managers
1908 births
Hungarian people of German descent
Association football goalkeepers
2000 deaths